Charles Green R.I. (1840–1898), was a British watercolourist and illustrator. He was the brother of Towneley Green R.I. (1836–1899).

References

1840 births
1898 deaths
19th-century English painters
English male painters
English illustrators
19th-century English male artists